The Rañjanā script (Lantsa) is an abugida writing system which developed in the 11th century and until the mid-20th century was used in an area from Nepal to Tibet by the Newar people, the historic inhabitants of the Kathmandu Valley, to write Sanskrit and Nepalbhasa. Nowadays it is also used in Buddhist monasteries in India; China, especially in the Tibetan Buddhist areas within the Tibet Autonomous Region, Sichuan, Yunnan, Qinghai and Gansu; Mongolia, and Japan. It is normally written from left to right but the Kutakshar form is written from top to bottom. It is also considered to be the standard Nepali calligraphic script.

Development
Rañjanā is a Brahmic script which developed around 1100 CE. It was used in India and is still used in Nepal by the Newar people to write the Newar language. The script is also used in most of the Mahayana and Vajrayana monasteries. Along with the Prachalit Nepal alphabet, it is considered one of the scripts of Nepal. It is the formal script of Nepal duly registered in the United Nation while applying for the free Nation. Therefore, it is a vital script to all Nepalese as well.

The Aṣṭasāhasrikā Prajñāpāramitā Sūtra lettered in gold ink by Bhiksu Ananda of Kapitanagar and dating back to the Nepal Sambat year 345 (1215 CE) is an early example of the script.

Alphabet

Vowels

Consonants

Vowel diacritics

The shape of the combining marks indicating the vowels आ ā, ए e, ऐ ai/ē,ओ o, and औ au/ō  in Ranjana script take a different form when combined with the eight consonants  ख kha, ग ga, n ञ nya, ठ ṭha ण ṇa, थ tha, ध dha or श sha(or where one of these is the first consonant in a combination) (In addition the vertical marks indicating  आ ā or ī may take a shorter form when combined with the consonants क ka, ज्ञ ja, or ठ ṭha.)

Numerals

Use

Rañjana is mostly used for printing Hindu and Buddhist scriptures and literature in Sanskrit and Buddhist Hybrid Sanskrit used by the Newar community. Rañjana is also in current use for printing “high status” documents (wedding invitations, certificates, etc) in Nepal in the Newar language and for Newar language book titles. In Mahayana and Vajrayana Buddhist traditions, it is famously used to write various mantras including the "Om mani padme hum" mantra of Avalokiteśvara, the mantra of Tara: "Om tare tuttare ture svaha", and the mantra of Manjusri: "Om a ra pa ca na dhi." The script is also used in Hindu scriptures.

In Chinese Buddhism and other East Asian Buddhism, the standard Sanskrit script for mantras and dhāraṇīs was not the Rañjanā script, but rather the earlier Siddhaṃ script that was widely propagated in China during the Tang dynasty. However, in late Imperial China, the influence of Tibetan Buddhism popularized the Rañjanā script as well, and so this script is also found throughout East Asia, but is not as common as Siddhaṃ. In Vietnam, Rañjanā script is often used during Buddhist rituals especially by monks in the central region such as Huế. Talismans are often made using Rañjanā mantras read "Om mani padme hum" or "Om cale cule cundi svaha"  the mantra of Cundi Bodhisattva. The script has also been adopted by Vietnamese folk shamans in their use of amulets such as Lỗ Ban phái, a Taoist folk sect that arrived from China named after Lu Ban, patron god of carpenters.

Use in Tibet 

When Rañjanā was introduced to Tibet, it was referred to as Lanydza, which is simply a Tibetan transcription of the Sanskrit word  or Lañja (which means 'tail' or 'foot'). Lanydza varies somewhat from the standard Rañjanā as written in Nepal today. In particular the glyph shapes of some consonants and ligatures differs and vowel diacritics do not usually change with the consonants  ख kha, ग ga, n ञ nya, ठ ṭha ण ṇa, ध dha  श sha as described above~ with the sole exception of the letter ठ ṭha. The shape of the numerals or digits also differs.  

In Tibet, the Lanydza variant is used to write Buddhist texts in Sanskrit. Examples of such texts include the Mañjuśrīnāmasamgīti, the Diamond Sutra and the Aṣṭasāhasrikā Prajñāpāramitā Sūtra. The Lanydza script is also found in manuscripts and printed editions of some Sanskrit-Tibetan lexicons such as the Mahāvyutpatti. and it  is frequently used on the title pages of Tibetan texts, where the Sanskrit title is often written in Lanydza, followed by a transliteration and translation in the Tibetan script. The script is also used to prepare Mantra and  Dharani inserted into Buddhist images and Stupa for consecration, as well as in the drawing of certain mandalas ( similar to the Japanese use of the Siddhaṃ script). 

Lanydza is frequently seen on  the outside of prayer wheels, and decoratively on the gateways, walls. beams and pillars of Tibetan temples.

Numerous alternative spellings of the term Lanydza exist, including the following:
 Lanja
 Landzha
 Lantsa
 Lantsha
 Lentsa
 Lendza

Monogram (Kutākshar)

Kutākshar is a monogram of the Ranjana script. It is only one of the Nepalese scripts that can be written in monogram.

Since 20th century in modern Nepal

After falling into disuse in the mid-20th century, the script has recently seen dramatically increased use. It is used by many local governments such as those of Kathmandu Metropolitan City, Lalitpur Sub-Metropolitan City, Bhaktapur Municipality, Thimi Municipality, Kirtipur Municipality, Banepa Municipality, in signboards, letter pads, and such. Regular programs are held in the Kathmandu Valley to promote the script and training classes are held to preserve the language. The script is being endorsed by the Nepal Bhasa movement and is used for headings in newspapers and websites.

A Nepalese-German project is trying to conserve the manuscripts of Rañjanā script.

A Unicode block for the script has also been proposed by Evertype.

Gallery

References

External links
Download Ranjana Newari Regular Font

Fynn, Christopher John. Ranjana (Lantsa) script

Ranjana script on Omniglot
Ranjana script
Saerji. (2009). Rañjanā script: Akṣara List of the Manuscript of Aṣṭasāhasrikāprajñāpāramitā (ca. the 11-12th Centuries). Research Institute of Sanskrit Manuscripts & Buddhist Literature, Peking University.

Newar
Brahmic scripts
Newar language
Writing systems of Newar language